Teresa Rohmann (born July 24, 1987 in Nuremberg) is a medley swimmer from Germany. She competed for her native country at the 2004 Summer Olympics in Athens, Greece, finishing in fifth place in the women's 200m individual medley event.

References
sports-reference

1987 births
Living people
German female swimmers
German female medley swimmers
Swimmers at the 2004 Summer Olympics
Olympic swimmers of Germany
Sportspeople from Nuremberg